George Curtis (17 August 1837 – 2 April 1885) was an Australian cricketer. He played two first-class matches for New South Wales between 1861/62 and 1865/66.

See also
 List of New South Wales representative cricketers

References

External links
 

1837 births
1885 deaths
Australian cricketers
New South Wales cricketers
Cricketers from Sydney